The 2012 Evening Echo Cork Senior Hurling Championship was the 124th staging of the county senior championship since its establishment in 1887. The draw for the 2012 fixtures took place on 6 October 2011. The championship began on 26 May 2012 and ended on 7 October 2012.

Carrigtwohill were the defending champions, however, they were defeated in the quarter-finals.  Sarsfield's won the title following a 1-15 to 1-13 victory over Bishopstown in the final.

Team changes

To Championship

Promoted from the Cork Premier Intermediate Hurling Championship
 Courcey Rovers

From Championship

Relegated to the Cork Premier Intermediate Hurling Championship
 Ballinhassig

Results

Divisions/colleges section

Round 1

Round 2

Round 3

Relegation play-off

Round 4

Quarter-finals

Semi-finals

Final

Championship statistics

Top scorers

Overall

Top scorers in a single game

Miscellaneous

 On 9 June 2012, Courcey Rovers record their first ever senior championship victory following a 0-16 to 1-8 defeat of Blackrock.
 St. Finbarr's beat Glen Rovers in the championship for the first time since 1988.
 Bishopstown qualify for the final for the first time.

References

External links
Senior Hurling Championship fixtures and results

Cork Senior Hurling Championship
Cork Senior Hurling Championship